The IRB Under 21 Rugby World Cup was the premier tournament for male rugby union players under the age of 21, organised by the sports governing body the International Rugby Board (IRB) annually from 2002 through 2006. Both it and the Under 19 Rugby World Championship were replaced by the IRB Junior World Championship for under-20 players beginning in 2008.

Finals

Format
Twelve teams take part in the tournament. They are split into four pools (labelled A-D) of three according to their past performance. Each team plays three matches against three teams of other pool (pool A plays against pool D and pool B plays against pool C). Four points are awarded for a win, two for a draw, and none for a loss. One bonus point is awarded for scoring four tries or more, and one bonus points is awarded for loss by seven points or less.

After all pool matches teams are ranked by total match points. Top four teams qualify for the semi-finals (1st against 4th and 2nd against 3rd). Likewise, other teams enter play-offs for positions 5–8 and 9–12.

External links
IRBU21.com

    
Defunct rugby union competitions for national teams
World Rugby competitions